Tabatabaei  (Ṭabāṭabāʾī; , Ṭabâṭabâyī) (also spelled Tabatabai, Tabatabaee, Tabatabaie, Tabatabaeyan) is a surname denoting descent from someone called Tabataba, in particular Ismail bin Ibrahim Al-Ghamr ibn Hasan ibn Hasan (son of Hasan ibn Hasan), a great-grandson of Ali, the fourth and last of the Rightly Guided Caliphs. It is one of many families of Sayyid Shia Muslims, predominant in Iran, but also in Iraq, Lebanon, Kuwait and Pakistan.

People
(by order of year of birth)
Mirza Sayyed Mohammad Tabatabai (1842–1920), Iranian leader of the Iranian Constitutional Revolution
Ali Haider Tabatabai (1854-1933), Indian poet and translator
Ali Tabatabaei (1869-1947), Iranian ayatollah commonly known as al-Qadi Tabatabai, who was famous for his high level of Irfan
Seyyed Hossein Borujerdi (1875-1961), Iranian grand ayatollah
Zia'eddin Tabatabaee (1888–1969), Iranian politician
Muhsin al-Hakim (1889–1970), Iraqi Marja
Muhammad Husayn Tabataba'i (1903-1981), Iranian philosopher, commonly known as Allameh Tabatabai
Hassan Tabatabaei Qomi (1912-2007), Iranian cleric who has repeatedly criticized the velayat-e faqih
Taqi Tabatabaei Qomi (born 1923), Iranian Twelver Shi'a Marja
Ali Akbar Tabatabaei (1930–1980), Iranian exiled politician, murdered in America
Jazeh Tabatabai (1931-2008), Iranian painter, poet, and sculptor
Seyyed Mehdi Tabatabaei (1936—2018), Iranian Shia cleric and conservative politician. Served as a member of the Parliament of Iran
Sadeq Tabatabaei (1943-2015), Iranian politician, former Deputy Prime Minister
Mohammad Ali Tabatabaei Hassani (1945-2017), Iraqi Twelver Shi'a Marja
Mumtaz (born 1947), Indian actress
Waleed Al-Tabtabaie (born 1964), Member of the Kuwaiti National Assembly.
Javad Tabatabai (born 1964), Iranian philosopher
Jasmin Tabatabai (born 1967), German-Iranian singer, songwriter and actress
Hadi Tabatabaei (born 1973, Iranian footballer
Ali Tabatabaee (born 1973), American punk musician, member and lead singer of Zebrahead
John Tabatabai, Welsh poker player
Ali Tabatabaei (actor) (1983–2015), Iranian film and television
Amin Tabatabaei (born 2001), Iranian chess grandmaster
Mohammad Hossein Tabatabai (born 1991), Iranian who could recite the entire Koran at age seven

Institutions and buildings
 House of Tabatabaei in Kashan, Iran
 Allameh Tabatabai University, public university in Tehran, Iran
 Allameh Tabatabaei High School, high school in Tehran, Iran

See also
Sayyid
Tabataba (film), 1988 African film

Hashemite people
Iranian-language surnames